The Wellcome – MRC Cambridge Stem Cell Institute at the University of Cambridge is a research centre for the nature and potential medical uses of stem cells. It is located on the Cambridge Biomedical Campus in Cambridge, England.

The Centre is funded by the Wellcome Trust and the Medical Research Council. 
The main areas of study include pluripotent and neural stem cells, as well as epidermal stem cells. Key advances in stem cell science at the centre include the elucidation of the role of the nanog protein in pluripotency and work on inhibiting cellular differentiation. It also conducts human embryo work as approved by the Human Fertilisation and Embryology Authority.

References

External links
Wellcome Trust-Medical Research Council Cambridge Stem Cell Institute

Health in Cambridgeshire
Stem Cell Institute, Wellcome-MRC Cambridge
Medical research institutes in the United Kingdom
Research institutes in Cambridge
Science and technology in Cambridgeshire
Stem cell research
Wellcome Trust